Dediyapada is a Tehsil and town in Narmada District with a sizable population of Tribal communities in which Vasava and Tadvi form the majority. This taluka is bounded by Zaghadia taluka (Bharuch), Sagbara taluka, Nandod taluka (Separated by Narmada river), Maharashtra state and Mandavi taluka (Surat district). Dediyapada is well connected with Bharuch, Ankleshwar, Rajpipla, Netrang, Sagbara, Akkalkuva and Shahada by National Highway & State Highway. Despite being remote in location, it is well connected by Gujarat and Maharashtra ST Buses.

Located in the divine forest range of Shoolpaneshwar Wildlife Sanctuary, it is a Tehsil place and second big town of Narmada District.
    Dediapada Taluka most famous traveling place (1)Ninai waterfall 2) kokam hanumadada mandir(kokam)(3)kevdi dhodh(saribar)(4)rampam waterfall

History

Geography 
It is well covered by the forest of Shoolpaneshwar WLS. Varied terrain makes it a good place. This district has variety of flora and fauna.

Tourist Places

Shoolpaneshwar Wildlife Sanctuary

Ninai Waterfall

Sagai Eco Camp Site

Mal-Samot

Civic Administration 
It is administered by local government body called Municipality consisting of elected members from the area.

Culture 
Dediyapada is a confluence of cultures from Gujarat and Maharashtra. Population mainly consists of tribes.

Economy 
Here the economy mainly runs on agriculture, herbs and wood industries.

Sports 

Cities and towns in Narmada district